ISO/TC 211 is a standard technical committee formed within ISO, tasked with covering the areas of digital geographic information (such as used by geographic information systems) and geomatics. It is responsible for preparation of a series of International Standards and Technical Specifications numbered in the number range starting at ISO-19101. The Chair of the committee was 1994-2016: Olaf Østensen; during 2017-2018: Christina Wasström; and from 2019 Agneta Gren Engberg.

Scope
ISO/TC 211 is concerned with the standardization in the field of digital geographic information. This work aims to establish a structured set of standards for information concerning objects or phenomena that are directly or indirectly associated with a location relative to the Earth.  

Project specification areas within the ISO/TC 211 technical committee include:
 Simple Features access
 Reference models
 Spatial and temporal schemas
 Location-based services
 Metadata
 Web feature and map services
 Classification systems

The ISO/TC 211 work is closely related to the efforts of the Open Geospatial Consortium. ISO/TC 211 have numerous liaisons with other organizations that often results in identical or nearly identical standards often being adopted by both organizations.

Working Groups
The work within ISO/TC211 is done in working groups, each with a specific focus. The currently active working groups are:
 Working Group 1 - Framework and reference model 
 Working Group 4 - Geospatial services 
 Working Group 6 - Imagery 
 Working Group 7 - Information communities 
 Working Group 9 - Information management 
 Working Group10 - Ubiquitous public access  

There are also a number of disbanded Working Groups: 
 Working Group 2  - Geospatial data models and operators
 Working Group 3  - Geospatial data administration 
 Working Group 5  - Profiles and functional standards
 Working Group 8  - Location based services

Revision of standards that were previously part of these working groups are now done directly under the TC since the disbandment of the groups.

Published standards
The list of standards by the ISO/TC 211 committee: 

ISO 6709:2008 Standard representation of geographic point location by coordinates

ISO 19101:2002 Geographic information -- Reference model
	
ISO/DIS 19101-1 Geographic information -- Reference model - Part 1: Fundamentals

ISO/TS 19101-2:2008 Geographic information -- Reference model -- Part 2: Imagery

ISO/TS 19103:2005 Geographic information -- Conceptual schema language

ISO/TS 19104:2016 Geographic information -- Terminology

ISO 19105:2000 Geographic information -- Conformance and testing

ISO 19106:2004 Geographic information -- Profiles

ISO 19107:2003 Geographic information -- Spatial schema

ISO 19108:2002 Geographic information -- Temporal schema

ISO/CD 19109 Geographic information -- Rules for application schema

ISO 19109:2005 Geographic information -- Rules for application schema

ISO 19110:2005 Geographic information -- Methodology for feature cataloguing

ISO 19111:2007 Geographic information -- Spatial referencing by coordinates

ISO 19111-2:2009 Geographic information -- Spatial referencing by coordinates -- Part 2: Extension for parametric values 

ISO 19112:2003 Geographic information -- Spatial referencing by geographic identifiers

ISO 19113:2002 Geographic information -- Quality principles

ISO 19114:2003 Geographic information -- Quality evaluation procedures

ISO 19115:2003 Geographic information -- Metadata

ISO/DIS 19115-1 Geographic information -- Metadata -- Part 1: Fundamentals

ISO 19115-2:2009 Geographic information -- Metadata -- Part 2: Extensions for imagery and gridded data

ISO 19116:2004 Geographic information -- Positioning services

ISO 19117:2005 Geographic information -- Portrayal
	
ISO 19118:2011 Geographic information -- Encoding

ISO 19119:2011 Geographic information -- Services

ISO/TR 19120:2001 Geographic information -- Functional standards

ISO/TR 19121:2000 Geographic information -- Imagery and gridded data

ISO/TR 19122:2004 Geographic information/Geomatics -- Qualification and certification of personnel

ISO 19123:2005 Geographic information -- Schema for coverage geometry and functions

ISO 19125-1:2004 Geographic information -- Simple feature access -- Part 1: Common architecture

ISO 19125-2:2004 Geographic information -- Simple feature access -- Part 2: SQL option

ISO 19126:2009 Geographic information -- Feature concept dictionaries and registers

ISO/TS 19127:2005 Geographic information -- Geodetic codes and parameters

ISO 19128:2005 Geographic information -- Web map server interface

ISO/TS 19129:2009 Geographic information -- Imagery, gridded and coverage data framework

ISO/TS 19130:2010 Geographic information - Imagery sensor models for geopositioning

ISO/DTS 19130-2 Geographic information -- Imagery sensor models for geopositioning -- Part 2: SAR, InSAR, Lidar and Sonar	

ISO 19131:2007 Geographic information -- Data product specifications	

ISO 19132:2007 Geographic information -- Location-based services -- Reference model

ISO 19133:2005 Geographic information -- Location-based services -- Tracking and navigation

ISO 19134:2007 Geographic information -- Location-based services -- Multimodal routing and navigation

ISO 19135:2005 Geographic information -- Procedures for item registration

ISO/TS 19135-2:2012 Geographic information - Procedures for item registration -- Part 2: XML schema implementation

ISO 19136:2007 Geographic information -- Geography Markup Language (GML)	

ISO 19137:2007 Geographic information -- Core profile of the spatial schema

ISO/TS 19138:2006 Geographic information -- Data quality measures

ISO/TS 19139:2007 Geographic information -- Metadata -- XML schema implementation

ISO/DTS 19139-2 Geographic Information -- Metadata -- XML Schema Implementation -- Part 2: Extensions for imagery and gridded data

ISO 19141:2008 Geographic information -- Schema for moving features

ISO 19142:2010 Geographic information -- Web Feature Service

ISO 19143:2010 Geographic information -- Filter encoding

ISO 19144-1:2009 Geographic information -- Classification systems -- Part 1: Classification system structure

ISO 19144-2:2012 Geographic information - Classification systems -- Part 2: Land Cover Meta Language (LCML)

ISO/DIS 19145 Geographic information -- Registry of representations of geographic point location

ISO 19146:2010 Geographic information -- Cross-domain vocabularies

ISO/CD 19147 Geographic information -- Location based services -- Transfer Nodes

ISO 19148:2012 Geographic information -- Linear referencing

ISO 19149:2011 Geographic information -- Rights expression language for geographic information -- GeoREL 

ISO/PRF TS 19150-1 Geographic information -- Ontology -- Part 1: Framework

ISO/CD 19150-2 Geographic information -- Ontology -- Part 2: Rules for developing ontologies in the Web Ontology Language (OWL)	

ISO/FDIS 19152 Geographic information -- Land Administration Domain Model (LADM) 

ISO/DIS 19153 Geospatial Digital Rights Management Reference Model (GeoDRM RM)

ISO/WD 19154 Geographic information -- Ubiquitous public access -- Reference model

ISO 19155:2012 Geographic information -- Place Identifier (PI) architecture

ISO 19156:2011 Geographic information -- Observations and measurements

ISO/DIS 19157 Geographic information -- Data quality

ISO/TS 19158:2012 Geographic information—Quality assurance of data supply

ISO/DTS 19159-1 Geographic information -- Calibration and validation of remote sensing imagery sensors and data -- Part 1: Optical sensors	

ISO/WD 19160-1  Addressing -- Part 1: Conceptual model

References

Further reading
  §13.3.2 ISO/TC 211.
 ISO/TC 211 Multi-Lingual Glossary of Terms

External links
 ISO/TC 211 official website
 Resource site for ISO/TC 211
 ISO/TC 211 committee website
 TC211 wiki
 Standards tracker - bug reports
 GitHub home - standards in progress